|}

The Tipperary Stakes is a Listed flat horse race in Ireland open to thoroughbreds aged two years only. It is run at Tipperary over a distance of five furlongs (1,006 metres), and it is scheduled to take place each year in July.

The race was first run in 2001 as the Entrepreneur Stakes.  It was renamed the Tipperary Stakes the following year, but generally also carries the name of a Coolmore Stud stallion, initially Danehill Dancer and more recently Excelebration, Pride of Dubai and U S Navy Flag.

Records
Leading jockey (3 wins):
Shane Foley – Sacred Aspect (2013), Yulong Baobei (2016), Dickiedooda (2020)

Leading trainer (3 wins):
 Aidan O'Brien  – Lahinch (2001), Parliament Square (2012), Land Force (2018)

Winners

See also
 Horse racing in Ireland
 List of Irish flat horse races

References
Racing Post:

Flat races in Ireland
Tipperary Racecourse
Flat horse races for two-year-olds
2001 establishments in Ireland
Recurring sporting events established in 2001